Mönkeberg is a municipality in the district of Plön, in Schleswig-Holstein, Germany. It is situated approximately 5 km northeast of Kiel.

References

Plön (district)